Yansheng Coins, commonly known as Chinese numismatic charms, refer to a collection of special decorative coins that are mainly used for rituals such as fortune telling, Chinese superstitions, and Feng shui. They originated during the Western Han dynasty as a variant of the contemporary Ban Liang and Wu Zhu cash coins. Over the centuries they evolved into their own commodity, with many different shapes and sizes. Their use was revitalized during the Republic of China era. Normally, these coins are privately funded and cast by a rich family for their own ceremonies, although a few types of coins have been cast by various governments or religious orders over the centuries. Chinese numismatic charms typically contain hidden symbolism and visual puns. Unlike cash coins which usually only contain two or four Hanzi characters on one side, Chinese numismatic charms often contain more characters and sometimes pictures on the same side.

Although Chinese numismatic charms are not a legal form of currency, they used to circulate on the Chinese market alongside regular government-issued coinages. The charms were considered valuable, as they were often made from copper alloys and Chinese coins were valued by their weight in bronze or brass. In some cases, charms were made from precious metals or jade. In certain periods, some charms were used as alternative currencies. For example, "temple coins" were issued by Buddhist temples during the Yuan dynasty when the copper currency was scarce or when copper production was intentionally limited by the Mongol government. 
 
Yansheng coins are usually heavily decorated with complicated patterns and engravings. Many of them are worn as fashion accessories or good luck charms. The Qing-dynasty-era cash coins have inscriptions of the five emperors Shunzhi, Kangxi, Yongzheng, Qianlong, and Jiaqing, which are said to bring wealth and good fortune to those that string these five coins together.

Chinese numismatic talismans have inspired similar traditions in Japan, Korea and Vietnam, and often talismans from these other countries can be confused for Chinese charms due to their similar symbolism and inscriptions. Chinese cash coins themselves may be treated as lucky charms outside of China.

Etymology 

The formal name for these coins, and the word's pronunciation was Yasheng coin or money, but in common modern usage Yansheng is the widely accepted pronunciation and spelling.

Yansheng coins are also known as "flower coins" or "patterned coins". They are alternatively referred to as "play coins" (wanqian, 玩钱) in China. Historically, the term "Yansheng coins" was more popular, but in modern China and Taiwan the term "flower coins" has become the more common name.

History and usage 

Yansheng coins first appeared during the Western Han dynasty as superstitious objects to communicate with the dead, to pray for favorable wishes, to terrify ghosts, or to use as lucky money.

In the Ming and Qing dynasties, the imperial government issued coins for national festivals or ceremonies such as the emperor's birthday. It was common for the emperor's sixtieth birthday to be celebrated by issuing a charm with the inscription Wanshou Tongbao (萬夀通寶), because 60 years symbolizes a complete cycle of the 10 heavenly stems and the 12 earthly branches.

In the case of these coins, "charm" in this context is a catchall term for coin-shaped items which were not official (or counterfeit) money. However, these numismatic objects were not all necessarily considered "magical" or "lucky", as some of these Chinese numismatic charms can be used as "mnemonic coins". The term is further used to identify a number of gambling tokens that were based on Chinese cash coins or incorporate such designs.

Origins 

The earliest Chinese coinage bore inscriptions that described their place of origin during the Warring States period and sometimes their nominal value. Other forms of notation came to be included, such as circles representing the sun, crescents representing the moon, and dots representing the stars, as well as blobs and lines. These symbols sometimes protruded from the surface of the coin (Chinese: 阳文; Pinyin: yáng wén) and sometimes they were carved, engraved or stamped (Chinese: 阴文; Pinyin: yīn wén). These symbols would eventually evolve into Chinese charms with coins originally being used as charms.

Dots were the first and most common form of symbol that appeared on ancient Chinese cash coins, such as the Ban Liang coins, and appeared mostly during the Han dynasty. These symbols were usually on the obverse side of the coins and were probably carved as a part of the mold, meaning that they were intentionally added. Crescent symbols on both the obverse and reverse sides of coins were added around the same period as the dots. After this, both regular Chinese numerals and counting rod numerals began to appear on cash coins during the beginning of the Eastern Han dynasty. Chinese characters began to appear on these early cash coins which could mean they were intended to circulate in certain regions or might indicate the names of those who cast the coins.

Coins made under Emperor Wang Mang of the Xin dynasty had a distinctive appearance from coinage of the Han dynasty era, and were later used as the basis of many Chinese amulets and charms.

Ancient Chinese texts refer to the Hanzi character for "star" (星) to not exclusively refer to the stars that are visible at night but to also have an additional meaning of "to spread" and "to disseminate" (布, bù). Other old Chinese sources stated that the character for "star" was synonymous with the term for "to give out" and "to distribute" (散, sàn). Based on these associations and the links between coinage and power, an understanding formed that cash coins should be akin to the star-filled night sky: widespread in circulation, numerous in quantity, and distributed throughout the world.

Another hypothesis on why star, moon, cloud and dragon symbols appeared on Chinese cash coins is that they represent yin and yang and the wu xing – a fundamental belief of the time – and specifically the element of water (水). The Hanzi character for a "water spring" (泉) also meant "coin" in ancient China. In Chinese mythology, the moon was an envoy or messenger from the heavens and water was cold air of yin energy that was accumulated on the moon. The moon was the spirit in charge of water in Chinese mythology, and the crescent symbols on cash coins could indicate that they were meant to circulate like water, which flows, gushes, and rises. The symbolism of "clouds" or "auspicious clouds" may refer to the fact that clouds cause rain; the I Ching mentions that water appears in the heavens as clouds, again bringing the implication that cash coins should circulate freely. The appearance of wiggly-lines that represent Chinese dragons happened around this time and may have also been based on the wu xing element of water, as dragons were thought to be water animals that were the bringers of both the winds and the rain; the dragons represented the nation, with freely flowing currency. In later Chinese charms, amulets, and talismans, the dragon became a symbol of the Chinese emperor and the central government of China and its power.

Later developments 

Most Chinese numismatic charms produced from the start of the Han dynasty until the end of the Northern and Southern dynasties (206 BCE – 589 CE) were very similar in appearance to the Chinese cash coins that were in circulation. The only differentiating factor that Chinese talismans had at the time were the symbols on the reverse of these coins. These symbols included tortoises, snakes, double-edged swords, the sun, the moon, stars, depictions of famous people and the twelve Chinese zodiacs. The major development and evolution of Chinese numismatic talismans happened during the period that started from the Six Dynasties and lasted until the Mongol Yuan dynasty. It was during this era that Chinese numismatic charms began using inscriptions that wished for "longevity" and "happiness", and these charms and amulets became extremely common in Chinese society. Taoist and Buddhist amulets also began to appear during this period, as did marriage coin charms with "Kama Sutra-like" imagery. Chinese numismatic charms also began to be made from iron, lead, tin, silver, gold, porcelain, jade, and paper. These charms also featured new scripts and fonts such as regular script, grass script, seal script, and Fulu (Taoist "magic writing" script). The association of Chinese characters into new and mystical forms added hidden symbolism.

Charms with inscriptions such as fú dé cháng shòu (福德長壽) and qiān qiū wàn suì (千秋萬歲, 1,000 autumns, 10,000 years) were first cast around the end of the Northern dynasties period and continued through the Khitan Liao, Jurchen Jin and Mongol Yuan dynasties. During the Tang and Song dynasties, open-work charms began to include images of Chinese dragons, qilin, flowers and other plants, fish, deer, insects, Chinese phoenixes, fish, and people. The open-work charms from this era were used as clothing accessories, adornment, or to decorate horses. The very common charm inscription cháng mìng fù guì (長命富貴) was introduced during the Tang and Song dynasties, when the reverse side of these talismans started showing Taoist imagery such as yin-yang symbols, the eight trigrams, and the Chinese zodiacs. During the Song dynasty, a large number of Chinese talismans were cast, especially horse coins which were used as gambling tokens and board game pieces. Fish charms meant to be worn around the waist were introduced during the reign of the Khitan Liao. Other new types emerged during the Jurchen Jin dynasty, with the influence of the steppe culture and arts of the Jurchen people. The Jin dynasty merged the Jurchen culture with Chinese administration, and the charms of the Jin dynasty innovated on the talismans of the Song dynasty which used hidden symbolism, allusions, implied suggestions, and phonetic homonyms to describe a meaning. Under the Jurchens, new symbolisms emerged: a dragon representing the emperor, a phoenix representing the empress, tigers representing ministers, lions representing the government as a whole, and cranes and pine trees that symbolized longevity. Hidden symbolism such as jujube fruits for "morning or early" and chickens symbolizing "being lucky" also emerged under the Jurchens.

Under the Ming and Manchu Qing dynasties, there was increased manufacture of amulets with inscriptions that wish for good luck and those that celebrate events. These numismatic talismans depict what is called the "three many": happiness, longevity, and having many progeny. Other common wishes included those for wealth and receiving a high rank from the imperial examination system. During this period, more Chinese numismatic talismans began using implied and hidden meanings with visual puns. This practice was particularly expanded upon during the Manchu Qing dynasty.

Styles 

Unlike government cast Chinese cash coins which typically only have four characters, Chinese numismatic charms often have more characters and may depict images of various scenes. They can come in several different styles:

 carved or engraved
 with animal
 with people
 with plants
 words or characters on coin
 sentences or wishes
 Chinese zodiac
 Taoism, Bagua, or Buddhism gods
 Horses or military themes
 Abnormal or combined styles

Early Chinese numismatic charms tended to be cast, until machine-struck coinage appeared in China during the 19th century.

A large number of Chinese numismatic charms have been cast over a period more than 2000 years, these charms have evolved with the changing culture as time passed which is reflected in their themes and inscriptions. In his 2020 work Cast Chinese Amulets British numismatist and author David Hartill had documented over 5000 different types of Chinese numismatic charms. Traditionally catalogues of these amulets are arranged in various of number of methods such as by shape, their size, the meaning of the charms, the Emperor's name, or any other common feature. While other catalogues deliberately avoid such categorizations as it would not be immediately clear to a novice (non-expert) whether an individual Chinese amulet would be considered to be a "Lucky", "Religious", "Family", or "Coin" type charm.

Types of Chinese charms

By function

Good luck charms 

Chinese numismatic "good luck charms" or "auspicious charms" are inscribed with various Chinese characters representing good luck and prosperity. There was popular belief in their strong effect and they were traditionally used in an effort to scare away evil and protect families. They generally contain either four or eight characters wishing for good luck, good fortune, money, a long life, many children, and good results in the Imperial examination system. Some of these charms used images or visual puns to make a statement wishing for prosperity and success. Some feature pomegranates which symbolise the desire for successful and skilled male children, to strengthen the family and continue its lineage.

Another common theme on Chinese numismatic charms are rhinoceroses. Its depiction is associated with happiness, because the Chinese words for "rhinoceros" and "happiness" are both pronounced xi. The rhinoceros became extinct in Southern China during the ancient period and the animal became enshrined in myth, with legends that the stars in the sky were being reflected in the veins and patterns of a rhinoceros horn. The horn of the rhinoceros was believed to emit a vapour that could penetrate bodies water, traverse the skies and open channels to communicate directly with the spirits.

A number of good luck charms contain inscriptions such as téng jiāo qǐ fèng (騰蛟起鳳, "a dragon soaring and a phoenix dancing" which is a reference to a story of Wang Bo), lián shēng guì zǐ (連生貴子, "May there be the birth of one honorable son after another"), and zhī lán yù shù (芝蘭玉樹, "A Talented and Noble Young Man").

Safe journey charms 

Safe journey charms are a major category of Chinese numismatic charms, which were produced out of a concern for personal safety while traveling. One side would usually have an inscription wishing for the holder of the charm to be granted a safe journey, while the other would have common talisman themes such as the Bagua, weapons, and stars. It is believed that the Boxers used safe journey charms as badges of membership during their rebellion against the Manchu Qing dynasty.

Peace charms 

Peace charms (Traditional Chinese: 天下太平錢; Simplified Chinese: 天下太平钱; Pinyin: tiān xià tài píng qián) have inscriptions wishing for peace and prosperity and are based on Chinese coins that use the characters 太平 (tài píng). These coins are often considered to have charm-like powers.

An archeological find of the 1980s established that they were first cast by the Kingdom of Shu after the collapse of the Han dynasty. This coin bore the inscription tài píng bǎi qián (太平百錢), was worth one hundred Chinese cash coins, and bore a calligraphic style which resembled charms more than contemporary coinage. During the Song dynasty, Emperor Taizong issued a coin with the inscription tài píng tōng bǎo (太平通寶), and under the reign of the Chongzhen Emperor appeared a Ming dynasty coin with the inscription tài píng (太平) on the reverse and chóng zhēn tōng bǎo (崇禎通寶) on the obverse. During the Taiping Rebellion, the Taiping Heavenly Kingdom issued coins ("holy coins") with the inscription tài píng tiān guó (太平天囯).

Peace charms, which were privately cast with the desire to wish for peace, were used on a daily basis throughout China's turbulent and often violent history. Under the Qing dynasty Chinese charms with the inscription tiān xià tài píng (天下太平) became a common sight. This phrase could be translated as "peace under heaven", "peace and tranquility under heaven", or "an empire at peace". Peace charms are also found to depict the twelve Chinese zodiacs and contain visual puns.

During the Qing dynasty, a tài píng tōng bǎo (太平通寶) peace charm was created that had additional characters and symbolism at the rim of the coin: on the left and right sides of the charm the characters 吉 and 祥, which can be translated as "good fortune", while on the reverse side the characters rú yì (如意, "as you wish") is located at the top and bottom of the rim. When these four characters are combined they read rú yì jí xiáng which is translated as "good fortune according to your wishes", a popular expression in China. This charm is a very rare design due to its double rim (重輪), which can be described as having a thin circular rim surrounding the broad outer rim. This specific charm has an additional inscription in the recessed area of the rim; an example of a contemporary Chinese cash coin which had these features would be a 100 cash xianfeng zhongbao (咸豐重寶) coin. On the reverse side of this Manchu Qing dynasty era charm are a multitude of inscriptions that have auspicious meanings such as qū xié qiǎn shà (驅邪遣煞, "expel and strike dead evil influences"), tassels and swords which represent a symbolic victory of good over evil, two bats which is a visual pun as the Chinese word for bat is similar to the Chinese word for happiness, and the additional inscription of dāng wàn (當卍, "Value Ten Thousand", the supposed symbolic denomination).

Burial coins 
 
 

Chinese burial coins (Traditional Chinese: 瘞錢; Simplified Chinese: 瘗钱; Pinyin: yì qián) a.k.a. dark coins (Traditional Chinese: 冥錢; Simplified Chinese: 冥钱; Pinyin: míng qián) are Chinese imitations of currency that are placed in the grave of a person that is to be buried. The practice dates to the Shang dynasty when cowrie shells were used, in the belief that the money would be used in the afterlife as a bribe to Yan Wang (also known as Yama) for a more favourable spiritual destination. The practice changed to replica currency to deter grave robbers, and these coins and other imitation currencies were referred to as clay money (泥錢) or earthenware money (陶土幣). Chinese graves have been found with clay versions of what the Chinese refer to as "low currency" (下幣), such as cowrie shells, Ban Liang, Wu Zhu, Daquan Wuzhu, Tang dynasty Kaiyuan Tongbao, Song dynasty Chong Ni Zhong Bao, Liao dynasty Tian Chao Wan Shun, Bao Ning Tong Bao, Da Kang Tong Bao, Jurchen Jin dynasty Da Ding Tong Bao, and Qing dynasty Qian Long Tong Bao cash coins. Graves from various periods have also been found with imitations of gold and silver "high currency" (上幣), such as Kingdom of Chu's gold plate money (泥｢郢稱｣(楚國黃金貨)), yuan jin (爰金), silk funerary money (絲織品做的冥幣), gold pie money (陶質"金餅"), and other cake-shaped objects (冥器). In modern use, Joss paper takes the place of clay replicas, and is burned rather than buried with the deceased.

"Laid to Rest" burial charms 

Chinese "Laid to Rest" burial charms are bronze funerary charms or coins usually found in graves. These coins were mostly found in graves dating from the late Qing dynasty period, though one was found in a coin hoard of Northern Song dynasty coins. The wéi is written using a simplified Chinese character (为) rather than the traditional Chinese version of the character (為). These coins are often excluded from numismatic reference books on Chinese coinage or talismans due to many taboos, as they were placed in the mouths of dead people and are considered unlucky and disturbing, and are undesired by most collectors.

Marriage and sex education charms 
 

Chinese marriage charms (Traditional Chinese: 夫婦和合花錢; Simplified Chinese: 夫妇和合花钱; Pinyin: fū fù hé hé huā qián) are Chinese numismatic charms or amulets that depict scenes of sexual intercourse in various positions. They are known by many other names, including secret play coins (Traditional Chinese: 秘戲錢; Simplified Chinese: 秘戏钱; Pinyin: mì xì qián), secret fun coins, hide (evade) the fire (of lust) coins (Traditional Chinese: 避火錢; Simplified Chinese: 避火钱; Pinyin: bì huǒ qián), Chinese marriage coins, Chinese love coins, Chinese spring money (Traditional Chinese: 春錢; Simplified Chinese: 春钱; Pinyin: chūn qián), Chinese erotic coins, and Chinese wedding coins. They illustrate how the newlywed couple should perform on their wedding night to meet their responsibilities and obligations to produce children. They may depict dates and peanuts symbolising the wish for reproduction, lotus seeds symbolising "continuous births", chestnuts symbolising male offspring, pomegranates symbolising fertility, brans symbolising sons that will be successful, "dragon and phoenix" candles, cypress leaves, qilins, bronze mirrors, shoes, saddles, and other things associated with traditional Chinese weddings.

The name "spring money" is a reference to an ancient Chinese ritual in which girls and boys would sing romantic music to each other from across a stream. Sex acts were traditionally only scarcely depicted in Chinese art but stone carvings from the Han dynasty showcasing sexual intercourse were found and bronze mirrors with various sexual themes were common during the Tang dynasty. It was also during the Tang dynasty that coins graphically depicting sex started being produced. Chinese love charms often have the inscription "wind, flowers, snow and moon" (風花雪月) which is an obscure verse referring to a happy and frivolous setting, although every individual character might also be used to identify a Chinese goddess or the "Seven Fairy Maidens" (七仙女). Other Chinese wedding charms often have inscriptions like  fēng huā yí rén (風花宜人), míng huáng yù yǐng (明皇禦影), and lóng fèng chéng yàng (龍鳳呈樣). These charms could also be used in brothels where a traveller could use the illustrations to make a request of a prostitute without knowing the local language.

Some Chinese marriage charms contain references to the well-known 9th century poem Chang hen ge, with figures illustrated in four different sex positions and four Chinese characters representing the spring, wind, peaches, and plums.

A design of Chinese, Korean, and Vietnamese marriage amulets display a pair of fish on one side and the inscription Eo ssang (魚双, "Pair of Fish") on the other side. In various Oriental cultures fish are associated with plenty and abundance. Fish are furthermore noted for their prolific ability to reproduce and that when they swim that this was in joy and are therefore associated with a happy and harmonious marriage. In Feng Shui, a pair of fish are associated with conjugal bliss and the joys of being in a matrimonial union.

House charms 

Chinese house charms refer to Chinese numismatic talismans placed within a house to bring good fortune to the place, or to balance the house according to Feng shui. These charms date to the Han dynasty and were placed in houses even while the building was under construction; they were also placed in temples and other buildings. Many traditional Chinese houses tend to display images of the menshen (threshold guardian). Some buildings were built with a "foundation stone" (石敢當), based on the Mount Tai in Shandong, with the inscription tài shān zài cǐ (泰山在此, "Mount Tai is here") or tài shān shí gǎn dāng (泰山石敢當, "the stone of Mount Tai dares to resist"). Ridgepoles in Chinese buildings are usually painted red and are decorated with red paper, cloth banners, and Bagua charms. Five poison charms are often used to deter unwanted human visitors as well as animal pests. Many Chinese house charms are small bronze statues of bearded old men assigned to protect the house from evil spirits, the God of War, Zhong Kui (鍾馗), and the "Polar Deity". House charms tend to have inscriptions inviting good fortune into the home like cháng mìng fù guì (長命富貴, "longevity, wealth and honour"), fú shòu tóng tiān (福壽同天, "good fortune and longevity on the same day"), zhāo cái jìn bǎo (招財進寶, "attracts wealth and treasure"), sì jì píng ān (四季平安, "peace for the four seasons"), wǔ fú pěng shòu (五福捧壽, "five fortunes surround longevity"), shàng tiān yán hǎo shì (上天言好事, "ascend to heaven and speak of good deeds"), and huí gōng jiàng jí xiáng (回宮降吉祥, "return to your palace and bring good fortune").

Palace cash coins 

Palace cash coins are sometimes included as a category of Chinese numismatic charms. These special coins, according to the Standard Catalog of World Coins by Krause Publications, were specifically produced to be presented as gifts during Chinese new year to the people who worked in the Chinese imperial palace such as imperial guards and eunuchs, who would hang these special coins below lamps. In his book Qing Cash, published by the Royal Numismatic Society in the year 2003, David Hartill noted that these palace cash coins were only produced during the establishment of a new reign era title. The first Chinese palace cash coins were produced in the year 1736 during the reign of the Qianlong Emperor and tend to be between 30 millimeters and 40 millimeters in diameter. These palace cash coins were produced until the end of the Qing dynasty.

These coins contain the reign titles Qianlong, Jiaqing, Daoguang, Xianfeng, Tongzhi, Guangxu, or Xuantong with "Tongbao" (通寶), or rarely "Zhongbao" (重寶), in their obverse inscription and the reverse inscription "Tianxia Taiping" (天下太平). These special cash coins were wrapped inside of a piece of rectangular cloth and every time that an Emperor died (or "ascended to his ancestors") the coins were replaced with new reign titles. Some Tianxia Taiping cash coins were manufactured by the Ministry of Revenue while others were produced by private mints. Palace issues tend to be larger than circulation cash coins with the same inscriptions.

By shape and design 

Most Chinese numismatic charms imitated the round coins with a square hole which were in circulation when the charms first appeared. As the charms evolved separately from government-minted coinage, coins shaped like spades, locks, fish, peaches, and gourds emerged. though most retained the appearance of contemporary Chinese coinage.

Gourd charms 

Gourd charms (Traditional Chinese: 葫蘆錢; Simplified Chinese: 葫芦钱; Pinyin: hú lu qián) are shaped like calabashes (bottle gourds). These charms are used to wish for good health, as the calabash is associated with traditional Chinese medicine, or for many sons, as trailing calabash vines are associated with men and carry myriad seeds. As the first character in the gourd is pronounced as hú (葫) which sounds similar to hù, the pronunciation of the Chinese word for "protect" (護) or for "blessing" (祜), gourd charms are also used to ward off evil spirits. Calabashes were believed to have the magical power of protecting children from smallpox, and gourd charms were believed to keep children healthy. Calabashes are also shaped like the Arabic numeral "8", which is a lucky number in China. A variant of the gourd charm is shaped like two stacked cash coins, a smaller one at top, to resemble a calabash. These charms have four characters and auspicious messages.

The gourd charm pictured to the right, which is composed of two replicas of Wu Zhu cash coins with a bat placed to obscure the character at their intersection, forms a visual pun. The Chinese word for "bat" sounds similar to that of "happiness", the square hole in the center of a cash coin is referred to as an "eye" (眼, yǎn), and the Chinese word for "coin" (錢, qián) has almost the same pronunciation as "before" (前, qián). This combination can be interpreted as "happiness is before your eyes".

Vault Protector coins 
 

Vault Protector coins (Traditional Chinese: 鎮庫錢; Simplified Chinese: 镇库钱; Pinyin: zhèn kù qián) were a type of coin created by Chinese mints. These coins were significantly larger, heavier and thicker than regular cash coins and were well-made as they were designed to occupy a special place within the treasury of the mint. The treasury had a spirit hall for offerings to the gods of the Chinese pantheon, and Vault Protector coins would be hung with red silk and tassels for the Chinese God of Wealth. These coins were believed to have charm-like magical powers that would protect the vault while bringing wealth and fortune to the treasury.

Vault protector coins were produced for over a thousand years starting in the country of Southern Tang during the Five Dynasties and Ten Kingdoms period and were produced until the Qing dynasty. Vault protector coins were typically cast to commemorate the opening of new furnaces for casting cash coins.

Open-work charms 

Open-work money (Traditional Chinese: 鏤空錢; Simplified Chinese: 镂空钱; Pinyin: lòu kōng qián) also known as "elegant" money (Traditional Chinese: 玲瓏錢; Simplified Chinese: 玲珑钱; Pinyin: líng lóng qián) are types of Chinese numismatic charms characterised by irregularly shaped openings or holes between the other design elements. Most open-work charms have mirrored designs on the reverse side, with Chinese characters rarely appearing. They tend have a single large round hole in the middle of the coin, or a square hole for those that feature designs of buildings. Compared to other Chinese charms, open-work charms are significantly larger and more often made from bronze than brass. They first appeared during the Han dynasty, though most of these are small specimens taken from various utensils. They became more popular during the reigns of the Song, Mongol Yuan, and Ming dynasties but lost popularity under the Manchu Qing dynasty.

Categories of open-work charms:

24 character charms 

24 character "Good Fortune" charms (Traditional Chinese: 二十四福字錢; Simplified Chinese: 二十四福字钱; Pinyin: èr shí sì fú zì qián) and 24 character longevity charms (Traditional Chinese: 二十四壽字錢; Simplified Chinese: 二十四寿字钱; Pinyin: èr shí sì shòu zì qián) refer to Chinese numismatic charms which have a pattern of twenty-four characters on one side which contains a variation of either the Hanzi character fú (福, good luck) or shòu (壽, longevity), the two most-common Hanzi characters to appear on Chinese charms. The ancient Chinese believed that the more characters a charm had, the more good fortune it would bring, although it is not known why 24 characters is the default used for these charms. One proposition claims that 24 was selected because it is a multiple of the number eight, which was seen as auspicious to the ancient Chinese due to its similar pronunciation to the word for "good luck". It may also represent the sum of the twelve Chinese zodiacs and the twelve earthly branches. Other possibilities include the 24 directions of the Chinese feng shui compass (罗盘), that Chinese years are divided into 12 months and 12 shichen, that the Chinese season markers are divided into 24 solar terms, or the 24 examples of filial piety from Confucianism.

Chinese Spade charms 

Spade charms are charms based on spade money, an early form of Chinese coin. Spade charms are based on Spade money which circulated during the Zhou dynasty until they were abolished by the Qin dynasty. Spade money was briefly reintroduced by Wang Mang during the Xin dynasty, and Chinese spade charms are generally based on this coinage.

Chinese lock charms 

Chinese lock charms (Traditional Chinese: 家鎖; Simplified Chinese: 家锁; Pinyin: jiā suǒ) are based on locks, and symbolize protection from evil spirits of both the holder and their property. They were also thought to bring good fortune, longevity, and high results in the imperial exams, and were often tied around the necks of children by Buddhist or Taoist priests. Chinese lock charms are flat and without moving parts, with a form that resembles the Hanzi character "凹", which can translate to "concave". All Chinese lock charms have Chinese characters on them. An example of a Chinese lock charm is the "hundred family lock" (Traditional Chinese: 百家鎖), traditionally funded by a poor family asking a hundred other families to each gift a cash coin as a gesture of goodwill for their newborn child, vesting an interest in the child's security. Many Chinese lock charms are used to wish for stability. Other designs of lock charms include religious mountains, the Bagua, and Yin Yang symbol.

Nine-Fold Seal Script charms 

Nine-Fold Seal Script charms (Traditional Chinese: 九疊文錢; Simplified Chinese: 九叠文钱; Pinyin:  jiǔ dié wén qián) are Chinese numismatic charms with inscriptions in nine-fold seal script, a style of seal script that was in use from the Song dynasty until the Qing dynasty. Examples from the Song dynasty are rare. Around the end of the Ming dynasty there were Nine-Fold Seal Script charms cast with the inscription fú shòu kāng níng (福壽康寧, "happiness, longevity, health and composure"), and bǎi fú bǎi shòu (百福百壽, "one hundred happinesses and one hundred longevities") on the reverse side.

Fish charms 

Fish charms (Traditional Chinese: 魚形飾仵; Simplified Chinese: 鱼形饰仵; Pinyin: yú xíng shì wǔ) are shaped like fish. The Chinese character for "fish" (魚, yú) is pronounced the same as that for "surplus" (余, yú), so the symbol for fish has traditionally been associated with good luck, fortune, longevity, fertility, and other auspicious things. As the Chinese character for "profit" (利, lì) is pronounced similar to "carp" (鯉, lǐ), carps are most commonly used for the motif of fish charms. Fish charms were often used in the belief that they would protect the health of children, and featured inscriptions wishing for the children who carry them to stay alive and safe.

Chinese peach charms 

Chinese peach charms (Traditional Chinese: 桃形掛牌; Simplified Chinese: 桃形挂牌; Pinyin: táo xíng guà pái) are peach-shaped charms used to wish for longevity. The ancient Chinese believed the peach tree to possess vitality as its blossoms appeared before leaves sprouted. Chinese Emperors would write the character for longevity (壽) to those of the lowest social class if they had reached high ages, which was seen to be among the greatest gifts. This character often appears on peach charms and other Chinese numismatic charms. Peach charms also often depict the Queen Mother of the West or carry inscriptions such as "long life" (長命, cháng mìng). Peach charms were also used to wish for wealth depicting the character "富" or higher Mandarin ranks using the character "貴".

Little shoe charms 

Little shoe charms are based on the association of shoes with fertility and the Chinese feminine ideal of small feet, which in Confucianism is associated with a narrow vagina, something the ancient Chinese saw as a sexually desirable trait to allow for birth of more male offspring. Intervention to create small feet was usually accomplished by foot binding from a young age. Girls would hang little shoe charms over their beds in the belief that it would help them find love. Shoes are also associated with wealth because their shape is similar to that of a sycee.

Chinese pendant charms 

Chinese pendant charms (Traditional Chinese: 掛牌; Simplified Chinese: 挂牌; Pinyin: guà pái) are Chinese numismatic charms that are used as decorative pendants. From the beginning of the Han dynasty, Chinese people began wearing these charms around their necks or waists as pendants, or attached these charms to the rafters of their houses, pagodas, temples or other buildings, as well as on lanterns. It is believed that open-work charms may have been the first Chinese charms that were used in this fashion. Fish, lock, spade, and peach charms were worn on a daily basis, with fish and lock charms worn mainly by young children and infants. Other charms were exclusively used for specific rituals or holidays. Some Han dynasty era charms contained inscriptions such as ri ru qian jin (日入千金, "may you earn a 1,000 gold everyday"), chu xiong qu yang (除凶去央, "do away with evil and dispel calamity"), bi bing mo dang (辟兵莫當, "avoid hostilities and ward off sickness"), or chang wu xiang wang (長毋相忘, "do not forget your friends"). Others resembled contemporary cash coins with added dots and stars. Some pendant charms had a single loop while most others also had either a square or round hole in the centre. Some Chinese pendant charms contain the Hanzi character gua (挂, "to hang"), though their form makes their purpose obvious. Although most pendant charms contain pictorial illustrations, the association of Chinese characters into new and mystical symbolic forms reached an even greater extreme when Taoists introduced "Taoist magic writing" (符文).

Chinese palindrome charms 

Chinese palindrome charms are very rare Chinese numismatic charms that depict what in China is known as "palindromic poetry" (回文詩), a form which has to make sense when reading in either direction but may not be a true palindrome. Because of their rarity, Chinese palindrome charms are usually excluded from reference books on Chinese numismatic charms. A known example of a presumably Qing dynasty period Chinese palindrome charm reads "我笑他說我看他打我容他罵" ("I, laugh, he/she, talks, I, look, he/she, hits, I, am being tolerant, he/she, scolds") in this case the meaning of the words can be altered depending on how this inscription is read, as definitions may vary depending on the preceding pronoun. This charm could be read both clockwise and counter-clockwise, and tells of two sides of a combative relationship which could be read as representing either party:

The reverse side of this coin features images of thunder and clouds.

Chinese charms with coin inscriptions 

Chinese charms with coin inscriptions (Traditional Chinese: 錢文錢; Simplified Chinese: 钱文钱; Pinyin: qián wén qián) used the contemporary inscriptions of circulating cash coins. These types of numismatic charms use the official inscriptions of government cast coinage due to the mythical association of Hanzi characters and magical powers as well as the cultural respect for the authority of the government and its decrees. For this reason even regular cash coins had been attributed supernatural qualities in various cultural phenomenon such as folk tales and feng shui. Some official coin inscriptions already had auspicious meanings, and these were selected to be used on Chinese numismatic talismans. During times of crisis and disunity, such as under the reign of Wang Mang, the number of charms with coin inscriptions seem to have increased enormously. Meanwhile, other Chinese cash coin inscriptions were selected due to a perceived force in the metal used in the casting of these contemporary cash coins; an example would be the Later Zhou dynasty era zhōu yuán tōng bǎo (周元通寶) charm based on cash coins with the same inscription. Even after the fall of the Xin dynasty, charms were made with inscriptions from Wang Mang era coinage like the Northern Zhou era wǔ xíng dà bù (五行大布) because it could be translated as "5 elements coin". Similarly with the Later Zhou dynasty's zhōu yuán tōng bǎo (周元通寶), the Song dynasty era tài píng tōng bǎo (太平通寶), the Khitan Liao dynasty era qiān qiū wàn suì (千秋萬歲, "thousand autumns and ten thousand years"), as well as the Jurchen Jin dynasty era tài hé zhòng bǎo (泰和重寶). Northern Song dynasty era charms may have been based on the same mother coins that were used to produce the official government cash coins, and given different reverses to distinguish them as charms.

During the Ming dynasty there were Chinese charms based on the hóng wǔ tōng bǎo (洪武通寶) with an image of a boy (or possibly the Emperor) riding either an ox or water buffalo. This charm became very popular as the first Ming Emperor was born as a peasant, which inspired low-born people that they could also do great things. There were a large number of Chinese numismatic charms cast with the reign title Zheng De (正德通寶), despite the government having deprecated cash coins for paper money at the time; these charms were often given to children as gifts. During the Manchu Qing dynasty a charm was cast with the inscription qián lóng tōng bǎo (乾隆通寶), but was fairly large and had the tōng bǎo (通寶) part of the cash coin written in a different style, with Manchu characters on its reverse to indicate its place of origin rotated 90 degrees. Some charms were also made to resemble the briefly cast qí xiáng zhòng bǎo (祺祥重寶) cash coins. Later charms were made to resemble the guāng xù tōng bǎo (光緒通寶) cast under the Guangxu Emperor but had dīng cái guì shòu (丁財貴壽, "May you acquire wealth, honor [high rank] and longevity") written on the reverse side of the coin.

During the 36th year of the Qianlong period (or the Gregorian year 1771), a number of fantasy cash coins with the inscription Qianlong Zhongbao (乾隆重寳) were cast in celebration of the Emperor's 60th birthday. Because the feast held on his 60th birthday was called Wanshoujie (萬壽節, "the party of ten thousand longevities") these numismatic charms are often referred to as wanshou qian (萬壽錢, "Currencies of the Ten Thousand Longevities").

Ming dynasty cloisonné charms 

Ming dynasty cloisonné charms (Traditional Chinese: 明代景泰藍花錢; Simplified Chinese: 明代景泰蓝花钱; Pinyin: míng dài jǐng tài lán huā qián) are extremely scarce Chinese numismatic charms made from cloisonné rather than brass or bronze. A known cloisonné charm from the Ming dynasty has the inscription nā mó ē mí tuó fó (南無阿彌陀佛, "I put my trust in Amitābha Buddha"), with various coloured lotus blossoms between the Hanzi characters. Each colour represents something different while the white lotus symbolises the earth's womb from which everything is born and was the symbol of the Ming dynasty. Another known Ming dynasty era cloisonné charm has the inscription wàn lì nián zhì (萬歷年制, "Made during the [reign] of Wan Li") and the eight Buddhist treasure symbols impressed between the Hanzi characters. These treasure symbols are the umbrella, the conch shell, the flaming wheel, the endless knot, a pair of fish, the treasure vase, the lotus, and the Victory Banner.

Cloisonné charms produced after the Ming dynasty (particularly those from the Qing dynasty) often have flower patterns.

Chinese money trees 

Chinese money trees (Traditional Chinese: 搖錢樹; Simplified Chinese: 摇钱树; Pinyin: yáo qián shù), or shengxianshu, ("immortal ascension trees"), are tree-like assemblies of charms, with the leaves made from numismatic charm replicas of cash coins. These money trees should not be with coin trees which are a by-product of the manufacture of cash coins, but due to their similarities it is thought by some experts that they may have been related. Various legends from China dating to the Three Kingdoms period mention a tree that if shaken would cause coins to fall from its branches. Money trees as a charm have been found in Southwest Chinese tombs from the Han dynasty, and are believed to have been placed there to help guide the dead to the afterlife and provide them with monetary support. According to one myth, a farmer watered the money tree seed with his sweat and watered its sapling with his blood, after which the mature tree provided eternal wealth; this implies a moral that one can only become wealthy through their own toil. Literary sources claim that the origin of the money tree lies with the Chinese word for "copper" (銅, tóng) which is pronounced similar to the word for "the Paulownia tree" (桐, tóng). The leaves of the Paulownia become yellow in autumn and take on the appearance of gold or bronze cash coins. Chen Shou (陳壽) mentions in the Records of the Three Kingdoms that a man named Bing Yuan (邴原) walked upon a string of cash coins while strolling and, unable to discover the owner, hung it in a nearby tree; other passersby noticed this string and began hanging coins in the tree with the assumption that it was a holy tree and made wishes for wealth and luck. The earliest money trees, however, date to the Han dynasty in present-day Sichuan and a Taoist religious order named the Way of the Five Pecks of Rice. Both the inscriptions and calligraphy found on Chinese money trees match those of contemporary Chinese cash coins, which typically featured replicas of Wu Zhu (五銖) coins during the Han dynasty while those from the Three Kingdoms period had inscriptions such as "Liang Zhu" (兩銖).

By theme

Chinese astronomy coins 

Chinese astronomy coins (Traditional Chinese: 天象錢; Simplified Chinese: 天象钱; Pinyin: tiān xiàng qián) are charms that depict star constellations, individual stars, and other astronomical objects from ancient Chinese astronomy. They may also contain texts from the Classic of Poetry, the Four Divine Creatures and the Twenty-Eight Mansions, or illustrations from the story the Cowherd and the Weaver Girl. Astronomy coins usually contain guideposts to differentiate the stars and constellations, divided into four cardinal directions.

Zodiac charms 

Chinese zodiac charms are based on either the twelve animals or the twelve earthly branches of Chinese astrology, based on the orbit of Jupiter, and some zodiac charms feature stellar constellations. By the time of the Spring and Autumn Period, the twelve earthly branches associated with the months and the twelve animals became linked; during the Han dynasty these also became linked to a person's year of birth. Some zodiac charms featured all twelve animals and others might also include the twelve earthly branches. They often feature the character gua (挂), which indicates that the charm should be worn on a necklace or from the waist. Modern feng shui charms often incorporate the same zodiac-based features.

Eight Treasures charms 

Chinese Eight Treasures charms (Traditional Chinese: 八寶錢; Simplified Chinese: 八宝钱; Pinyin: bā bǎo qián) depict the Eight Treasures, also known as the "Eight Precious Things" and the "Eight Auspicious Treasures", and refer to a subset of a large group of items from antiquity known as the "Hundred Antiques" (百古) which consists of objects utilised in the writing of Chinese calligraphy such as painting brushes, ink, writing paper and ink slabs, as well as other antiques such as Chinese chess, paintings, musical instruments and various others. Those most commonly depicted on older charms are the ceremonial ruyi (sceptre), coral, lozenge, rhinoceros horns, sycees, stone chimes, and flaming pearl. Eight Treasures charms can alternatively display the eight precious organs of the Buddha's body, the eight auspicious signs, various emblems of the eight Immortals from Taoism, or eight normal Chinese character. They often have thematic inscriptions.

Liu Haichan and the Three-Legged Toad charms 

These charms depict Taoist transcendent Liu Haichan, one of the most popular figures on Chinese charms, and the Jin Chan (money frog). The symbolism of these charms has regional differences, as in some varieties of Chinese the character "chan" has a pronunciation very similar to that of "coin" (錢 qián). The mythical Jin Chan lives on the moon, and these charms symbolize wishing for that which is "unattainable". This can be interpreted as attracting good fortune to the charm's holder, or that the attainment of money can lure a person to their downfall.

The Book of Changes and Bagua charms (Eight Trigram charms) 

Chinese charms depicting illustrations and subjects from the I Ching ( The Book of Changes) are used to wish for the cosmic principles associated with divination in ancient China, such as simplicity, variability, and persistence. Bagua charms may also depict the Bagua (the Eight Trigrams of Taoist cosmology). Bagua charms commonly feature depictions of trigrams, the Yin Yang symbol, Neolithic jade cong's (琮), the Ruyi sceptre, bats, and cash coins.

Book of Changes and Bagua charms are alternatively known as Yinyang charms because the taijitu is often found with the eight trigrams. This is also a popular theme for Vietnamese numismatic charms and many Vietnamese versions contain the same designs and inscriptions.

Five poisons talismans 

Five poisons talismans (五毒錢) are Chinese charms decorated with inscriptions and images related to the fifth day of the fifth month of the Chinese calendar (天中节), the most inauspicious day according to tradition. This day marked the start of summer which was accompanied with dangerous animals, the spread of pathogens through infection and the alleged appearance of evil spirits. These animals included those known as the five poisons (五毒): snakes, scorpions, centipedes, toads, and spiders. These are often depicted on five poisons talismans, or possibly with lizards, the three-legged toad or tiger. The ancient Chinese believed that poison could only be thwarted with poison, and that the amulet would counter the hazardous effects of the animals displayed. An example of a five poisons charm bears the legend "五日午时" ("noon of the 5th day"), and the amulets were commonly worn on that day.

Eight Decalitres of Talent charms 

The Eight Decalitres of Talent charm is a Qing dynasty era handmade charm with four characters. The rim is painted blue, the left and right characters are painted green, and the top and bottom characters are painted orange. The inscription bā dòu zhī cái (八鬥之才), which could be translated as "eight decalitres of talent", is a reference to a story in which Cao Zhi struggled with his brother Cao Pi, under the belief that he was oppressed out of envy for his talents. The inscription was devised by the Eastern Jin dynasty poet Xie Lingyun, referring to a saying that talent was divided into ten pieces and Cao Zhi received eight of the ten.

Tiger Hour charms 

Tiger Hour charms are modeled after the Northern Zhou dynasty wǔ xíng dà bù (五行大布, "Large Coin of the Five Elements") cash coins, but tend to have a round hole rather than a square hole. The reverse of these charms feature the inscription yín shí (寅時), which is a reference to the shichen of the tiger (the "tiger hour"), and have an image of a tiger and a lucky cloud.

"Cassia and Orchid" charms 

"Cassia and Orchid" charms are extremely rare Chinese numismatic charms dating to the Manchu Qing dynasty with the inscription guì zi lán sūn (桂子蘭孫, "cassia seeds and orchid grandsons"). These charms use the Mandarin Chinese word for Cinnamomum cassia (桂, guì) as a pun, because it sounds similar to the Mandarin Chinese word for "honourable" (貴, guì) while the word for "seed" is also a homonym for "son". The Mandarin Chinese word for orchid (蘭, lán) refers to zhī lán (芝蘭 , "of noble character") which in this context means "noble grandsons". The inscription on the reverse side of this charm reads róng huá fù guì (榮華富貴, "high position and great wealth") describing the wish to produce sons and grandsons who would pass the imperial examination and attain a great rank as a mandarin.

Men Plow, Women Weave charms 

Men Plow, Women Weave charms (Traditional Chinese: 男耕女織錢; Simplified Chinese: 男耕女织钱; Pinyin: nán gēng nǚ zhī qián) are Chinese numismatic charms depicting scenes related to the production of rice and sericulture. The charms can feature inscriptions such as tián cán wàn bèi (田蠶萬倍, "may your [rice] fields and silkworms increase 10,000 times") on their obverse and may have images of a spotted deer on their reverse.

The strict division of the sexes, apparent in the policy that "men plow, women weave", partitioned male and female histories as early as the Zhou dynasty, with the Rites of Zhou even stipulating that women be educated specifically in "women's rites".

Chinese Boy charms 

Chinese Boy charms (Traditional Chinese: 童子連錢; Simplified Chinese: 童子连钱; Pinyin: tóng zǐ lián qián) are Chinese numismatic charms that depict images of boys in the hope that these charms would cause more boys to be born in the family of the holder. They usually have an eyelet to be carried, hung, or worn, and are more commonly found in Southern China. The traditional ideal for a Chinese family was to have five sons and two daughters, and boys were the preferred sex for filial piety, carrying on the family lineage, and qualifying for the imperial examination. The boys depicted on these charms are often in a position of reverence. Some boy charms contain inscriptions like tóng zǐ lián qián (童子連錢) which connect male offspring to monetary wealth. Boy statuettes belonging to boy charms can also be found on top of open-work charms. Some boy charms contain images of lotus seeds because the Chinese word for lotus sounds similar to "continuous", and wishes for continuity through the male line.

Charms with musicians, dancers, and acrobats 

Chinese charms with "barbarian" musicians, dancers, and acrobats (Traditional Chinese: 胡人樂舞雜伎錢; Simplified Chinese: 胡人乐舞杂伎钱; Pinyin: hú rén yuè wǔ zá jì qián) appeared during either the Khitan Liao or the Chinese Song dynasty. These charms generally depict four individuals of which one is doing an acrobatic stunt (such as a handstand) while the others are playing various musical instruments: a four-string instrument which might possibly be a ruan, a flute, and a wooden fish. Although most numismatic catalogs refer to these charms as depicting "barbarians" or huren (胡人, literally "bearded people") the characters depicted on these charms have no beards. The reverse side of these charms depict four children or babies playing and enjoying themselves, which is a common feature for Liao dynasty charms; above these babies is a person resembling a baby that appears to ride on something.

Chinese treasure bowl charms 

Chinese treasure bowl charms are Chinese numismatic charms that feature references to the mythical "treasure bowl" (聚寶盆) which would usually grant unending wealth to those who hold it but may also be responsible for great sorrow. These charms are pendants with an image of the treasure bowl filled with various objects from the eight treasures on one side and the inscription píng ān jí qìng (平安吉慶, "Peace and Happiness") on the reverse. The loop of the charm is the form of a dragon; the string would be placed between the legs and the tail of the dragon, while the dragon's head looks upward from the bottom of the charm.

Another type of Chinese "treasure bowl" charm has the obverse inscription Zhaocai Jinbao (招財進寳), these charms have dragon-shaped swivel.

Confucian charms 

Confucian charms are Chinese numismatic charms that depict the traditions, rituals, and moral code of Confucianism, such as filial piety and "righteousness". Examples of Confucian charms would include a charm that depicts Shenzi carrying firewood on a shoulder pole, open-work charms depicting stories from "The Twenty-Four Examples of Filial Piety" (二十四孝), the "five relationships" (五倫), Meng Zong kneeling beside bamboo, Dong Yong (a Han dynasty era man) working a hoe, Wang Xiang with a fishingpole. Confucian inscriptions include fù cí zǐ xiào (父慈子孝, "the father is kind and the son is filial") read clockwise, yí chū fèi fǔ (義出肺腑, "righteousness comes from the bottom of one's heart"), zhōng jūn xiào qīn (忠君孝親, "be loyal to the sovereign and honor one's parents"), huā è shuāng huī (花萼雙輝, "petals and sepals both shine"), and jìng xiōng ài dì (敬兄愛第, "revere older brothers and love younger brothers").

Taoist charms 
 

Taoist charms (Traditional Chinese: 道教品壓生錢; Simplified Chinese: 道教品压生钱; Pinyin: dào jiào pǐn yā shēng qián) are Chinese numismatic charms that contain inscriptions and images related to Taoism. Since ancient times, the Chinese had attributed magical powers and influence to Hanzi characters. They believed that certain characters could impact spirits, which were in turn believed to be responsible for good and ill fortune. The Huainanzi describes spirits as horror-stricken at being commanded by the magical powers of the Hanzi characters used for amulets and charms. Many early Han dynasty talismans were worn as pendants containing inscriptions requesting that people who were deified in the Taoist religion to lend them protection. Some Taoist charms contain inscriptions based on Taoist "magic writing" (Chinese: 符文, also known as Taoist magic script characters, Taoist magic figures, Taoist magic formulas, Taoist secret talismanic writing, and Talismanic characters) which is a secret writing style regarded as part of Fulu. Its techniques are passed from Taoist priests to their students and differ between Taoist sects, with a secrecy that led many people to believe that they would have more effect in controlling the will of the spirits.

As the majority of these charms asked Leigong (the Taoist God of Thunder) to kill the evil spirits or bogies, these numismatic charms are often called "Lei Ting" charms (雷霆錢) or "Lei Ting curse" charms. As imperial decrees had absolute authority, this reinforced the popular myth that Hanzi characters were somehow magical, and inspired Chinese talismans to take the forms of imperial decrees. Many Taoist talismans read as if by a high-rank official commanding the evil spirits and bogies with inscriptions such as "let it [the command] be executed as fast as Lü Ling", "quickly, quickly, this is an order", and "[pay] respect [to] this command". Taoist talismans can contain either square holes or round ones. Many Taoist amulets and charms contain images of Liu Haichan, Zhenwu, the Bagua, yin-yang symbols, constellations, Laozi, swords, bats, and immortals.

During the Song dynasty, a number of Taoist charms depicting the "Quest for Longevity" were cast. These contain images of an immortal, incense burner, crane, and a tortoise on the obverse and Taoist "magic writing" on the reverse. Taoist charms containing the quest for immortality are a common motif and reproductions of this charm were commonly made after the Song period. Some Taoist charms from the Qing dynasty contain images of Lü Dongbin with the inscription fú yòu dà dì (孚佑大帝, "Great Emperor of Trustworthy Protection"). This charm notably contains a round hole.

A Taoist charm from either the Jin or Yuan dynasty without any written text shows what is commonly believed to be either a "boy under a pine tree" (松下童子) or a "boy worshipping an immortal" (童子拜仙人), but an alternative hypothesis is that this charm depicts a meeting between Laozi and Zhang Daoling. This is based on the fact that the figure supposedly representing Zhang Daoling is carrying a cane which in Mandarin Chinese is a homophone for "Zhang". On the reverse side of the charm are the twelve Chinese zodiacs, each in a circle surrounded by what is referred to as "auspicious clouds" which number eight.

Buddhist charms and temple coins 

Buddhist charms (Traditional Chinese: 佛教品壓勝錢; Simplified Chinese: 佛教品压胜钱; Pinyin: fó jiào pǐn yā shēng qián) are Chinese numismatic charms that display Buddhist symbols of mostly Mahayana Buddhism. These charms can have inscriptions in both Chinese and Sanskrit (while those with Sanskrit inscriptions did not appear until the Ming dynasty), these charms generally contain blessings from the Amitābha Buddha such as coins with the inscription ē mí tuó fó (阿彌陀佛).

Temple coins often had inscriptions calling for compassion and requesting for the Buddha to protect the holder of the coin. Most temple coins are small. Some of them contain mantras from the Heart Sūtra. Some Buddhist charms are pendants dedicated to the Bodhisattva Guanyin. Common symbols are the lotus which is associated with the Buddha, and the banana which is associated with Vanavasa. Less commonly, some Buddhist charms also contain Taoist symbolism including Taoist "magic writing" script. There are Buddhist charms based on the Ming dynasty era hóng wǔ tōng bǎo (洪武通寶) but larger.

Japanese Buddhist charms in China 

Japanese Buddhist monks brought large numbers of Japanese numismatic charms to China.  Frequently encountered is the Buddhist qiě kōng cáng qì (且空藏棄) which was cast in Japan from 1736 to 1740 during the Tokugawa shogunate, and dedicated to the Ākāśagarbha Bodhisattva based on one of the favourite mantras of Kūkai. Ākāśagarbha is one of the eight immortals who attempts to free people from the cycle of reincarnation with compassion. Another Japanese Buddhist charm frequently found in China has the inscription nā mó ē mí tuó fó (南無阿彌陀佛, "I put my trust in [the] Amitābha Buddha").

Chinese talismans with sword symbolism 
 

Swords are a common theme on Chinese numismatic charms, and coins were often assembled into sword-shaped talismans. Most Chinese numismatic charms that feature swords often show a single sword. According to Chinese legends, the first swords in China appeared under the reign of the legendary Yellow Emperor. During the Spring and Autumn Period, the notion developed that swords could be used against evil spirits and demons. Under the Liu Song dynasty swords became a common instrument in religious rituals, most particularly in Taoist rituals; according to the Daoist Rituals of the Mystery Cavern and Numinous Treasure (洞玄靈寶道學科儀) it was essential for students of Taoism to be able to forge swords which had the capability to dispel demonic entities. Many Taoist sects formed during this period believed that swords could defeat demons and also contained medical properties. Under the Sui and Tang dynasties ritualistic swords constructed of peach wood started to appear. Around this time, Chinese amulets with sword themes began to be produced; often these amulets resembled Chinese cash coins but had crossed swords decorated with ribbons or fillets on them, as the ancient Chinese believed that these items enhanced the powers of the item they were tied to. Chinese swords were commonly engraved with imagery representing the Big Dipper, which was believed to have unlimited magical power, and this also became common for charms that featured swords.

The image of two swords on Chinese amulets stems from a legend where Taoist leader Zhang Daoling saw Laozi appear to him on a mountain in present-day Sichuan and gave him two swords. Alternatively, two swords can also represent two dragons from a legend where a man named Lei Huan (雷煥) received two swords and gave one to his son Lei Hua (雷華), who lost it in a river; a servant tasked with retrieving it witnessed two coiled and entwined Chinese dragons.

Another popular way swords are integrated in Chinese numismatic talismans is by stringing actual or replica cash coins into a sword-shape. In feng shui, these coin-swords are often hung to frighten away demons and evil spirits. Chinese talismans of swordsmen usually depict one of the Taoist immortals Zhong Kui or Lu Dongbin. Swordsmen also appear on zodiac charms, Bagua charms, elephant chess pieces, lock charms, and other Chinese numismatic charms. Another person who appears on Chinese amulets is Zhenwu, who is regarded as the perfect warrior.

A common inscription on Chinese sword charms is qū xié jiàng fú (驅邪降福, "Expel evil and send down good fortune [happiness]"), but most commonly these charms feature inscriptions or "imperial orders"/"edicts" (敕令, chì lìng) commanding demons and evil spirits to be expelled. Sometimes an image of a calamus is used, as the leaves of this plant resemble a sword.

By other purpose

Horse coins 

Horse coins (Traditional Chinese: 馬錢; Pinyin: mǎ qián) were a type of Chinese charm that originated in the Song dynasty. Most horse coins tend to be round, three centimeters in diameter, with a circular or square hole. The horses featured on these coins are depicted in various positions. Their historical use is unknown, though it is speculated that they were used as game board pieces or gambling counters. Horse coins were most often manufactured from copper or bronze, though there are a few documented cases of manufacture from animal horn or ivory. The horse coins produced during the Song dynasty are considered to be of the best quality and craftsmanship and tend to be made from better metal than those which followed.

Horse coins often depicted famous horses from Chinese history, while commemorative horse coins would also feature riders. An example is the coin "General Yue Yi of the State of Yan" which commemorates a Yan attempt to conquer the city of Jimo.

Xiangqi pieces 

The game of xiangqi (a.k.a. Chinese chess) was originally played with either metallic or porcelain pieces, and these were often collected and studied by those with an interest in Chinese cash coins, charms and horse coins. These coins are regarded as a type of Chinese charm and are divided into the following categories:

 Elephants (象)
 Soldiers (卒)
 Generals (将)
 Horses (马)
 Chariots (車) 
 Guards (士)
 Canons (炮)
 Palaces (宫)
 Rivers (河)

The earliest known Xiangqi pieces date to the Chongning era (1102–1106) of the Song dynasty and were unearthed in the province of Jiangxi in 1984. Xianqi pieces were also found along the Silk Road in provinces like Xinjiang and were also used by the Tanguts of the Western Xia dynasty.

Chinese football charms 

During the Song dynasty, Chinese numismatic charms were cast that depict people playing the sport of cuju, a form of football. These charms display four images of football players in various positions around the square hole in the middle of the coin. The reverse side of the coin depicts a dragon and a phoenix, which are the traditional symbols representing men and women, possibly indicating the unisex nature of the sport.

Chinese "World of Brightness" coins 

During the late Qing dynasty, cast coinage was slowly replaced by machine-struck coinage. At the same time, machine-struck charms with the inscription guāng míng shì jiè (光明世界, "World of Brightness") started appearing that looked very similar to the contemporary milled guāng xù tōng bǎo (光緒通寶) cash coins. There are three variations of the "World of Brightness" coin: the most common one contains the same Manchu characters on the reverse as the contemporary guāng xù tōng bǎo cash coins, indicating that this coin was produced by the mint of Guangzhou. Another version has the same inscription written on the reverse side of the coin, while a third variant has nine stars on the reverse aide of the coin. Modern numismatists haven't determined the meaning, purpose, or origin of these charms. One hypotheses proposes that these coins were a form of hell money because it is thought that "World of Brightness" in this context would be a euphemism for "world of darkness", which is how the Chinese refer to death. Another hypotheses suggests that these coins were gambling tokens. A third proposes that these coins were used by the Heaven and Earth Society due to the fact that the Hanzi character míng (明) is a component of the name of the Ming dynasty (明朝), which meant that the inscription guāng míng (光明) could be read as "the glory of the Ming".

Paizi designs featured on Chinese numismatic charms 

In November 2018, Dr. Helen Wang of the British Museum posted an article on the website Chinese money matters where she noted that the British Museum was in possession of Chinese talismans that featured designs based on paizi (牌子). According to Wang, the Chinese author Dr.  mentions these charms as "Hanging plaques and charms of unusual shapes" (掛牌與異形錢) in his 2008 book Chinese Charms: Art, Religion and Folk Belief (中國花錢與傳統文化), and also notes that some of these pieces depict lingpai (令牌). Wang also mentions that the American Gary Ashkenazy noted examples of "pendant charms" (挂牌) with these designs on his Primaltrek website. Based on later comments made by Andrew West Tangut characters appeared on paizi produced in the Western Xia and comments by Fang made on Twitter were noted by Wang that paizi inspired designs not only appeared on rectangular talismans but also on cash coin-shaped charms where the paizi is featured directly above the square centre hole, and often feature Chinese zodiacs in their designs. The British Museum is also in possession of Chinese talismans with these designs which they acquired from the Tamba Collection (which was originally in the hands of Kutsuki Masatsuna, 1750–1802).

Chinese cash coins with charm features 

Many government-issued cash coins and other currencies such as Spade and Knife money that did not have any extra charm-like features were considered to have "charm-like qualities" and were treated as charms by some people. The Wang Mang era knife coin, with a nominal value of 5,000 cash coins, was often seen as a charm by the people because the character 千 (for 1,000) is very similar to the character 子 which means "son". The inscription of the knife coin could be read as "worth five sons". A coin from Shu Han with the nominal value of 100 Wu Zhu cash coins featured a fish on the reverse of the inscription which symbolises "abundance" and "perseverance" in Chinese culture. Another Shu Han era coin contained the inscription tai ping bai qian which was taken as an omen of peace and this coin is often considered to be a peace charm. During the Jin dynasty a coin was issued with the inscription fēng huò (豐貨) which could be translated as "(the) coin of abundance"; possessing it was believed to be economically beneficial, and it was popularly known as the "cash of riches".

During the Tang dynasty period, images of clouds, crescents, and stars were often added on coins, which the Chinese continued to use in subsequent dynasties. During the Jurchen Jin dynasty coins were cast with reverse inscriptions that featured characters from the twelve earthly branches and ten heavenly stems. During the Ming dynasty stars were sometimes used decoratively on some official government-produced cash coins. Under the Manchu Qing dynasty yōng zhèng tōng bǎo (雍正通寶) cash coins cast by the Lanzhou Mint were considered to be charms or amulets capable of warding against evil spirits and demons because the Manchu word "gung" looked similar to the broadsword used by the Chinese God of war, Emperor Guan.

The commemorative kāng xī tōng bǎo (康熙通寶) cast for the Kangxi Emperor's 60th birthday in 1713 was believed to have "the powers of a charm" immediately when it entered circulation. It contains a slightly different version of the Hanzi symbol "熙" at the bottom of the cash, which lacked the vertical line common at the left part of the character; the part of this symbol which was usually inscribed as "臣" has the middle part written as a "口" instead.  Notably, the upper left area of the symbol "通" contains a single dot as opposed to the usual two dots used during this era. Several myths were attributed to this coin over the following 300 years; one of these myths was that the coin was cast from golden statues of the 18 disciples of the Buddha, which earned this coin the nicknames "the Lohan coin" and "Arhat money". It was given to children as yā suì qián (壓歲錢) during Chinese new year, some women wore it as an engagement ring, and in rural Shanxi young men wore this like golden teeth. The coin was made from a copper alloy but it was not uncommon for people to enhance the coin with gold leaf.

Chinese star charms 

Chinese star charms refers to Song dynasty era dà guān tōng bǎo (大觀通寶) cash coins that depict star constellations on the reverse side of the coin. These coins are often considered to be among the most beautiful Chinese cash coins because of their "slender gold" script (瘦金書) which was written by Emperor Huizong. This coin was used to make star charms because the word guān means star gazing and is a compound word for astronomy and astrology.

Chinese poem coins 

Chinese poem coins (Traditional Chinese: 詩錢; Simplified Chinese: 诗钱; Pinyin: shī qián, alternatively 二十錢局名) are Chinese cash coins cast under the Kangxi Emperor, a Manchu Emperor known for his poetry who wrote the work Illustrations of Plowing and Weaving (耕織圖) in 1696. The coins produced under the Kangxi Emperor all had the obverse inscription Kāng Xī Tōng Bǎo (康熙通寶) and had the Manchu character  (Boo, building) on the left side of the square hole and the name of the mint on the right. As the name Kangxi was composed of the characters meaning "health" (康) and "prosperous" (熙) the Kāng Xī Tōng Bǎo cash coins were viewed as having auspicious properties. As the cash coins were produced at twenty-three mints, some people placed these coins together to form poems in adherence to the rules of Classical Chinese poetry. These coins were always placed together to form the following poems:

The strung "charm" of twenty coins, also known as "set coins" (套子錢), was seen as inconvenient to carry. Charms were thus produced that had ten of the twenty mint marks on each side of the coin. These charms were also distinguished from the actual cash coins by having round holes. They were sometimes painted red, as a lucky colour, and sometimes had inscriptions wishing for good fortunes such as:

Kāng Xī Tōng Bǎo cash coins produced at the Ministry of Revenue and the Ministry of Public Works in the capital city of Beijing are excluded from these poems.

Chinese Numismatic Charms Museum 

On 1 February 2015, a Chinese Numismatic Charms Museum (Traditional Chinese: 中國古代民俗錢幣博物館; Simplified Chinese: 中国古代民俗钱币博物馆; Pinyin: zhōng guó gǔ dài mín sú qián bì bó wù guǎn) was opened in the Hainanese city of Haikuo. The collection of the museum contains both Chinese coins and paper money and has more than two thousand Chinese numismatic charms dating from the Han dynasty to the Republic of China.

Charms from ethnic minorities

Liao dynasty charms 

Liao dynasty charms are Chinese numismatic charms produced during the Khitan Liao dynasty that are written in Khitan script and, unlike Liao dynasty coins, were read counter-clockwise. Because Khitan script hasn't been completely deciphered, these rare charms aren't fully understood by modern experts. Some Liao dynasty era charms had no inscriptions at all, and are not well understood as the Khitan people may have interpreted certain symbols differently from the Chinese. One of the most well-known Liao dynasty charms is the "Mother of Nine Sons" charm, which bears no inscription. It depicts three groups of three people which are believed to be the sons of the woman riding a dragon on the other side; the three groups are believed to symbolise the three levels of the imperial examination system. A more recent hypothesis proposes that the person riding the dragon is the Yellow Emperor returning to the heavens and that the people represent the Nine Provinces (九州).

Charms of the Sui people 

In 2004, a Sui coin was discovered dating to the Northern Song dynasty between 1008 and 1016, with the inscription dà zhōng xiáng fú (大中祥符) on one side and the word "wealth" written in Sui script on the other. This is the only known coin produced by the Sui people and established their differing numismatic tradition from the Han Chinese. Several numismatic charms have been attributed to the Sui people from the Sandu Shui Autonomous County, such as a charm depicting male and female dragons (being transformed from fish) with the twelve Chinese zodiacs and the twelve earthly branches written in Sui script on the reverse. Unlike Chinese charms, Sui charms differentiate show male genitalia on the male dragon, which seems to be a common feature for male dragons on numismatic charms of neighboring ethnic groups.

Implied and hidden meanings 

The implied and hidden meanings of Chinese numismatic talismans (Traditional Chinese: 諧音寓意; Simplified Chinese: 谐音寓意; Pinyin: xié yīn yù yì) refers to the non-obvious meanings ascribed to them. These can take many forms which can involve hidden symbolism in their inscriptions as well as visual puns.

One fundamental difference between cash coins and numismatic charms is that the majority of cash coins have four character inscriptions that usually bear the reign names, indicating the period of production and their nominal value. While most Chinese numismatic charms also have four character inscriptions, these do not serve for identification but contain wishes and desires such as auspicious inscriptions hoping that good fortune or health will arrive to the carrier, or that they'll succeed in the business world or do well on the imperial examination. Other inscriptions, however, wish for evil and dark spirits or ghosts to go away, or for misfortune to be averted. Unlike cash coins, Chinese numismatic charms depict a large range of images that are intended to enhance the symbolism of the charm. Charms may also contain visual and spoken puns, the latter of which is facilitated by the nature of Chinese languages in which many written Hanzi characters have the same pronunciation. The Chinese talismans produced under the reigns of the Ming and Manchu Qing dynasties often used visual and spoken puns. These implied or hidden meanings are referred in Mandarin Chinese as jí xiáng tú àn (吉祥圖案, "lucky pictures" or a rebus). It is not uncommon for Chinese talismans to depict animals, plants, and other things as a substitute for words due to their similarities in pronunciation despite there being no other relationship between them or what is expressed with the imagery.

List of symbols that appear on Chinese numismatic charms and their implied meanings

See also 

 Chinese token (alternative currency)
 Bamboo tally

Notes

References

Further reading 

 Books about Chinese numismatic charms in the public domain. (Wikimedia Commons)

External links 

 Yansheng coins in ancient China

Amulets
Talismans